Koçören can refer to:

 Koçören, Çüngüş
 Koçören, Defne